Sidney Harold Meteyard RBSA (1868 – 4 April 1947) was an English art teacher, painter and stained-glass designer. A member of the Birmingham Group, he worked in a late Pre-Raphaelite style heavily influenced by Edward Burne-Jones and the Arts and Crafts Movement.

Life and career

Meteyard was born in Stourbridge and studied under Edward R. Taylor at the Birmingham School of Art, where he was to teach for 45 years from 1886. He exhibited at the Paris Salon and the Royal Academy from 1900 to 1918, was elected an Associate of the Royal Birmingham Society of Artists in 1902 and made a full member in 1908. He was later their Honorary Secretary.

A friend of William Morris and Edward Burne-Jones, Meteyard worked across a wide variety of media from his studio in Livery Street near Snow Hill station. In 1890 he was one of the pupils at the School of Art to paint a set of murals for Birmingham Town Hall and he later produced works in stained glass, enamel and tempera, and illustrated a number of books including a notable edition of Henry Wadsworth Longfellow's "The Golden Legend". He also illustrated the Roll of Honour, in Birmingham's Hall of Memory.

Meteyard was instrumental in facilitating the donation of Elford Hall to the city of Birmingham.

His first marriage was to Lizzie Sarah Wilkes Fairfax Muckley by special licence in June 1892 until November 1939 when she died.  He then married jeweller Kate Eadie, a Birmingham School of art student and later fellow RBSA associate, who was also his model.

He suffered with poor eyesight late in life and was blind for his final year. He died on 4 April 1947 at Malt House, Cookhill, Worcestershire and was buried on 11 April at Brandwood End Cemetery, Birmingham, after a service at St Paul's Church, Cookhill.

References

1868 births
1947 deaths
English artists
Arts and Crafts movement artists
People from Stourbridge
People from Birmingham, West Midlands
Members and Associates of the Royal Birmingham Society of Artists
Alumni of the Birmingham School of Art
Academics of the Birmingham School of Art